Benussi is an Italian surname. Notable people with the surname include:

Femi Benussi (born 1945), Italian actress
Francesco Benussi (born 1981), Italian footballer
Vittorio Benussi (1878–1927), Austrian-Italian psychologist

Italian-language surnames